Elena Belova (born 1947) is a Russian world champion foil fencer.

Elena Belova may also refer to:

Elena Belova (biathlete) (born 1965), Russian Olympic biathlete in 1992
Elena Belova (footballer) (born 1985), Uzbekistani goalkeeper and coach
Elena Belova (physicist), Soviet-American plasma physicist

See also
 Black Widow (Yelena Belova), a fictional character in American comic books published by Marvel Comics